Charles Langton (11 July 1823 – 18 November 1900) was an English first-class cricketer.

Langton was born at Liverpool and was educated at Rugby School, entering in 1837. He made two appearances in first-class cricket for Lancashire against Yorkshire in 1849, played at Sheffield and Manchester. He scored 21 runs in his two matches, with a high score of 7, while with the ball he took 3 wickets.

Langton ran an insurance brokerage business, based in London and Liverpool, with his company Langton Charles & Co. being liquidated in 1866. By 1875, he was involved with the Liverpool Juvenile Reformatory Association as a treasurer, assisting with administration of the reformatory school ship Akbar, alongside a reformatory farm for boys and a reformatory school for girls. He died at Aigburth in November 1900.

References

External links

1823 births
1900 deaths
Cricketers from Liverpool
People educated at Rugby School
English cricketers
Lancashire cricketers